Milaan Foundation is a non-governmental organization co-founded by Dhirendra Pratap Singh in 2007, headquartered in Gurgaon, India. The foundation advocated the continuation of secondary education and the health of adolescent girls. It also focuses on preventing child marriage and gender-based violence for adolescent girls from low-socio-economic communities in India. It supports education for underprivileged girls and also works to bring awareness about menstrual health and hygiene among women in India.

History 
Milaan Foundation was founded in 2007 by Dhirendra Pratap Singh and three of his mates from the University of Delhi. Its name is derived from two words, Milan, meaning union, and the Urdu word Elaan, which means declaration. It is a registered 501(c)3 nonprofit organization.

The foundation's initial purpose was to facilitate quality education for children of rural and socio-economically backward regions. In the same year, they started a makeshift school in Kaintain village of Sitapur district in Uttar Pradesh. In its early years, the team from Milaan Foundation visited the villages to identify girls who dropped out of schools and helped them get admission to the foundation's own school. The organization is majorly active in Uttar Pradesh, Madhya Pradesh, and Karnataka.

Initiatives

Swarachna School 
Milaan's Swarachna School was launched in 2007 in a remote village called Kaintain in Sitapur district of Uttar Pradesh. It provides secondary education to first-generation learners with a focus on adolescent girls. The school currently educates 500 children up to class 12th.

In 2016, the foundation built its first senior-secondary wing on the land donated by the village administration.

Girl Icon Program 
The foundation started its flagship Girl Icon Program in 2015, which is a girl-led leadership program for Indian girls aged between 12 and 18 years that encourages them to speak out, and spread awareness of gender-based issues.

These girls are called Girl Icons. As of 2020, the program has implemented 953 social action projects and impacted over 10,000 adolescent girls, 375 of whom have become Girl Icons. In 2021, all of the Girl Icons continued their secondary education and 80% pursued higher education. As a result, 95% of girls delayed early marriage. Girl Icons have stopped over 50 child marriages from occurring as of 2020. 

The foundation's flagship program works from a grassroots level upward by activating girl leaders as change agents in their own community. The program begins with leadership and development training and the fellows complete social action projects in their communities.

Funding 
In October 2022, Milaan Foundation partnered with Sony Music Entertainment, under which the organization received funding from Sony Music's Global Justice Fund, a fund that is a part of Sony Music Group that supports Social justice and Anti-racism initiatives worldwide. The funding will be used in providing education, health, life skill enhancement, community development and agency to work towards gender equality among adolescent girls in Uttar Pradesh, India.

Milaan Foundation has also been funded by the Girls Opportunity Alliance Fund, a program of the Barack Obama Foundation, headed by Michelle Obama.

See also 
 Child marriage in India
 Culture and menstruation

References 

Women's organisations based in India
Charities based in India
2007 establishments in Delhi
Non-profit organisations based in India
Menstrual cycle
Organizations established in 2007